Beyond the Last Frontier is a 1943 American Western film about an undercover Texas Ranger, John Paul Revere, within Big Bill Hadley's gang of crooks. Howard Bretherton directed the film and John K. Butler and Morton Grant wrote the screenplay. The film stars Eddie Dew as Johnny Revere, Harry Woods as Big Bill Hadley, Robert Mitchum as Trigger Dolan, Lorraine Miller as Susan Cook, and Smiley Burnette as Frog Millhouse.

It was the first in the 'John Paul Revere' series of films, followed by Pride of the Plains and Beneath Western Skies.

References

External links

1943 films
1943 Western (genre) films
Republic Pictures films
American Western (genre) films
American black-and-white films
1940s American films